Karpovskaya is a rural locality (a village) in Almozerskoye Rural Settlement, Vytegorsky District, Vologda Oblast, Russia. The population was 34 as of 2002. There are 2 streets.

Geography 
Karpovskaya is located 69 km southeast of Vytegra (the district's administrative centre) by road. Votolino is the nearest rural locality.

References 

Rural localities in Vytegorsky District